XHBV-FM is a radio station on 95.7 FM in Moroleón, Guanajuato. XHBV carries a full service format known as Radio Alegría.

History
XHBV began as XEBV-AM 1100, with a concession awarded on September 12, 1979. It operated as a 500-watt daytimer on 1100 kHz and was owned by María del Rosario Valencia de Moreno. By the end of its time on AM, it was operating with 5 kW day and 1 kW night.

References

Radio stations in Guanajuato
Radio stations established in 1979